Kim Min-jun (born July 24, 1976) is a South Korean actor.

Career
Kim began his career as a model, then made a memorable acting debut as the rebel leader in Damo. He alternates playing romantic leads (In-soon is Pretty, Surgeon Bong Dal-hee, Romance Town, Beloved) with playing villains (A Love, Tazza, Hindsight).

Under the name "DJ Vesper MJ," Kim has also been active as a club DJ since 2009.

On December 20, 2012, Kim announced on his Twitter that he would be taking a temporary hiatus from acting. He returned to the entertainment scene three months later when actor Park Joong-hoon cast him in his directorial debut Top Star.

In late 2013, he joined the reality/variety show I Live Alone, as well as the multicultural children's travelogue Coo Coo Class.

Personal life
Kim was married on October 11, 2019 to designer Kwon Da-mi, who is the elder sister of G-Dragon. Their first child, a son, was born on 4 February 2022.

Filmography

Film

Television series

Variety show
2 Days & 1 Night (KBS, 2015)
Coo Coo Class (tvN, 2013-2014)
I Live Alone (MBC, 2013-2014)
Homme 4.0 (XTM, 2012)
The Duet (MBN, 2012)
Homme 3.0 (XTM, 2011)
2010 World Cup Special - Waving the Taegukgi (SBS, 2010)
Family Outing (SBS, 2009)

Music video

Awards
2011 5th Mnet 20's Choice Awards: Hot Trendy Guy
2008 17th Buil Film Awards: Best Supporting Actor (A Love)
2004 40th Baeksang Arts Awards: Best New Actor, TV (Damo)
2003 MBC Drama Awards: Best New Actor (Damo)

References

External links
 
 
 

South Korean male models
South Korean male television actors
South Korean male film actors
Living people
1976 births
Best New Actor Paeksang Arts Award (television) winners
Dong-a University alumni